Hovea lorata, is a species of flowering plant in the family Fabaceae and is endemic to eastern Australia. It is a shrub with lorate (strap-shaped) leaves, and mauve and greenish-yellow, pea-like flowers.

Description

Taxonomy and naming
Hovea lorata was first formally described in 2001 by Ian R. Thompson in Australian Systematic Botany from specimens collected by James Henderson Ross near Goombungee in 1986.

Distribution and habitat
This species of pea grows in forest and woodland on sandy or rocky soils and occurs from south-eastern Queensland to the Mount Royal Range in New South Wales, with an outlier near Longreach in central Queensland.

References

longipes
Flora of Queensland
Flora of New South Wales
Fabales of Australia
Plants described in 2001